Stanisław Lanckoroński (c. 1597–1657) was a Polish–Lithuanian magnate as well as a politician and military commander.

Stanisław became starost of Skała in 1641, castellan of Halicz in 1646, castellan of Kamieniec, voivode of Bracław Voivodeship and Grand Regimentarz of the Crown in 1649, voivode of Ruthenian Voivodeship in 1652, Field Crown Hetman from 1654 until 19 February 1657 and starost of Stobnice and Dymirsk.

He was married to Anna Sienienska and had eight children: Hieronim Lanckoroński, Przecław Lanckoroński, Franciszek Stanislaw Lanckoroński, Jan Lanckoroński, Zbigniew of Brzezia, Mikołaj Lanckoroński, Marcin Lanckoroński and Joanna Lanckorońska.

Polish people of the Russo-Polish War (1654–1667)
Polish nobility
Stanislaw (Hetman)
1590s births
1657 deaths
Members of the Sejm of the Polish–Lithuanian Commonwealth
Polish people of the Polish–Muscovite War (1605–1618)
Polish military personnel of the Khmelnytsky Uprising
Field Crown Hetmans